Sahara is the first full-length studio album by the Israeli metal band Orphaned Land, released on November 25, 1994 by French label Holy Records. The 2002 digipak re-release of the album features three bonus tracks: "Above You All", "Pits of Despair" and "The Beloved's Cry (Martini remix – Hangis Han)" and edited cover art. The songs "Seasons Unite", "The Beloveds Cry", "My Requiem", "Orphaned Land – The Storm Still Rages Inside..." are all from the demo The Beloved's Cry.

Track listing
 "The Sahara's Storm" – 7:59
 "Blessed Be Thy Hate" – 9:25
 "Ornaments of Gold" – 7:08
 "Aldiar Al Mukadisa" – 3:15 (Translated: Holy Land)
 "Seasons Unite" – 8:30
 "The Beloved's Cry" – 4:33
 "My Requiem" – 8:27
 "Orphaned Land – The Storm Still Rages Inside..." – 9:10

Digipak bonus tracks
 "Above You All" – 4:57
 "Pits of Despair" – 4:20
 "The Beloved's Cry (Martini remix – Hangis Han)" – 10:05

Personnel

Band members
 Kobi Farhi – vocals
 Yossi Sasi – lead guitars, oud
 Matti Svatitzki – rhythm guitar
 Uri Zelcha – bass
 Sami Bachar – drums
 Itzik Levi – keyboards, sampler, piano

Guest musicians
 Hadas Sasi – female vocals
 Albert Dadon – tarbuka
 Abraham Salman – kanun
 "Neve Israel" synagogue – background vocals
 Amira Salah – female "Arab" vocals
 Unknown musician goes by the name "Vovin" – guitars

Production and other
 Recorded in "Sigma" Studios, Tel Aviv, Israel, June 1994
 Produced by Orphaned Land
 Engineered by Tamir Muskat
 Assisted by Gary Gani
 Second assistant engineers: Eran Zira, Yotam Agam
 Mixed by Tamir Muskat, Orphaned Land, Gary Gani and Asaf Bar-Lev
 Executive producer Holy Records, Orphaned Land and Asaf Bar-Lev
 Logo by Uri Zelcha and Kobi Farhi
 Photos by Gil Pasternak
 Cover: The Blue Mosque, Istanbul, Turkey

External links
 Sahara at Orphaned Land official site

1994 debut albums
Orphaned Land albums
Holy Records albums